Fraser Mills was a municipality in British Columbia on the north bank of the Fraser River, incorporated in 1913, but since amalgamated with the City of Coquitlam.

History
Located on the northern shore of the Fraser River, the area was originally the site of a sawmill. The mill was known at first as the Ross McLaren Mill and opened in 1889. However, it closed soon after when co-founder James McLaren died. The site remained unused for many years until the mill was reopened as the Fraser River Sawmills. Due to a labour shortage, 400 Francophones were recruited from Quebec. They settled in an area just north of the mill now known as Maillardville. Similarly in the early 20th century, many Punjabi Sikhs came to work in the mills and settled on the south slope of Coquitlam.

During the Great Depression many workers were laid off. Wage reductions which were imposed on the remaining workforce led to a ten-week strike. The mill eventually closed in 2001.

Location
The Fraser Mills neighbourhood is located in the southwestern part of Coquitlam, and south of the Maillardville neighbourhood, which was founded as a townsite for the workers at the large lumber mill whose grounds comprised Fraser Mills. It was just east of the boundary of the City of New Westminster and mostly on the south side of the Trans-Canada and Lougheed Highways.  The site for many years after its abandonment was the Terranova landfill for Greater Vancouver waste disposal, land which has since become a focus for big-box store development along United Boulevard, which has come to serve as an alternate route for traffic bypassing jams on the adjacent freeway and highway.

The city has designated the area as Waterfront Village Centre and has re-zoned it to include both commercial and residential use.

See also
List of company towns

References

External links
BCGNIS entry "Fraser Mills (community)"
Fraser Mills history

Populated places on the Fraser River
Former municipalities in British Columbia
Labour disputes in British Columbia